Hans Gunnar Axén (born 9 July 1967) is a Swedish Moderate Party politician and a member of the Swedish Riksdag for Östergötland from 1998 to 2014.

Born and raised in Norrköping, he was at one time the chairman of the local Moderate Youth League district. He still actively supports the Moderate Youth League in Östergötland, which has made him rather popular among young Moderate Party members. He was a PR consultant before being elected to the Riksdag in 1998. He is known for his liberalism and was one of the few in the Moderate Party who voted for adoption rights for homosexuals. He managed to beat Gunilla Carlsson to the number one spot on the Moderate Party list in Östergötland for the Riksdag election in 2006.

External links 
Riksdagen: Gunnar Axén (m)
Official homepage: Gunnar Axén

1967 births
Living people
People from Norrköping
Members of the Riksdag from the Moderate Party
Members of the Riksdag 1998–2002
Members of the Riksdag 2002–2006
Members of the Riksdag 2006–2010
Members of the Riksdag 2010–2014
20th-century Swedish politicians
21st-century Swedish politicians